The Arab Observer was an English-language weekly news magazine published in Cairo, Egypt, between 1960 and 1966.

History and profile
The Arab Observer was founded by Zain Nagati in 1960. At the time, it was one of the only English-language publications from the Middle East. Although not officially a state organ, it generally followed the political orthodoxy of the time and supported the Nasser's government.

Its most famous contributor was Maya Angelou, who worked as an editor while she was in Cairo. Mahmoud Amr is the former editor-in-chief of the magazine.

See also
 List of magazines in Egypt

References

1960 establishments in Egypt
1966 disestablishments in Egypt
Defunct political magazines published in Egypt
English-language magazines
Magazines established in 1960
Magazines disestablished in 1966
Magazines published in Cairo
Weekly magazines published in Egypt
Weekly news magazines